Jules Destrooper is a Belgian food company based in Lo, West Flanders. It was founded in 1886 by Jules Destrooper (1856–1934).

Jules Destrooper produces a range of premium biscuits and is mainly known for its small butterwaffle known as lukken.  The company exports products to about 75 countries all over the world and offers private-label production services.

The company was acquired in 2015 by GT&CO, a holding company of the Vandermarliere family.

Jules Destrooper is a royal warrant holder of the Court of Belgium.

References

External links 
 
 
Food and drink companies of Belgium
Food and drink companies established in 1886
Companies based in West Flanders
1886 establishments in Belgium
2015 mergers and acquisitions